David Sunday is a Nigerian footballer who last played as a forward for Mohammedan Sporting Club in the Indian Calcutta Premier Division.

Career

Chirag United Kerala
Sunday signed for Chirag United Club Kerala in 2011. On 16 April 2012 Sunday scored a hat-trick as Chirag lost 3–4 to East Bengal FC in an I-League match.

Career statistics

Club
Statistics accurate as of 6 May 2012

References

Nigerian footballers
Living people
I-League players
Chirag United Club Kerala players
Mohammedan SC (Kolkata) players
Year of birth missing (living people)
Sportspeople from Lagos
Association football forwards